Tzvi Elimelech Spira of Dinov (1783–January 11, 1841) was a famous Hasidic Rebbe in Poland.
A prolific writer, known as the author of Bnei Yissachar, a classic Hasidic text containing conversations about the Torah. He is also the author of many other works on various topics. He stubbornly fought against the Haskalah movement.

He was a nephew of Elimelech of Lizhensk and a student of Menachem Mendel of Rimanov, Yaakov Yitzchak of Lublin and Yisroel Hopstein. Alternately, he was the rabbi of several cities of Poland, and led work from Dynów. 

The traditions of Zvi Elimelech Spira from Dynuw continue among his descendants and rabbis in Brooklyn. His grave in Poland became a place of pilgrimage for the Hasidim.

References

1783 births
1841 deaths
Hasidic rebbes